Central station is a Jacksonville Skyway monorail station in Jacksonville, Florida. It is the transfer point for the system's Northbank and Southbank lines. It is located on Bay Street between Pearl and Julia Streets in Downtown Jacksonville.

History 
The Central station was one of the three original Jacksonville Skyway stations that opened in June 1989. At the time it was the eastern terminus of the line, which ran west to Jefferson station and Terminal station (now LaVilla station). All three stations were closed between December 1996 and December 1997 when the Skyway system switched from Matra to Bombardier Transportation technology. It was designed as a transfer hub for subsequent extensions to the north and south, which were completed in 1997 and 1998, respectively. It allows transfer between trains heading east from Jefferson station and north from San Marco station. Additionally, the station was constructed to accommodate a future eastern expansion along Bay Street.

The next stations in the line are James Weldon Johnson Park station to the north, Jefferson station to the west, and San Marco station across the river to the south. Points of interest nearby include the Jacksonville Landing, the Northbank Riverwalk, the Times-Union Center for the Performing Arts, and many businesses.

References 

Jacksonville Skyway stations
Railway stations in the United States opened in 1987
1987 establishments in Florida